Muhammad Riaz may refer to:
 Muhammad Riaz Khan, Pakistan Army general
 Muhammad Riaz (footballer)